Everett Falconer Harrison (July 2, 1902 – February 10, 1999) was an American theologian.

Early life and education 
Harrison was born on July 2, 1902 in Skagway, Alaska to Presbyterian missionaries. He attended the University of Washington (BA, 1923)
and then Princeton University (AM, 1927) and Princeton Theological Seminary (Th.B, 1927) where he studied under J. Gresham Machen. Harrison was also ordained as a Presbyterian minister in 1927. He received two doctorates:  Th.D. from Dallas Theological Seminary in 1938 and a Ph.D from the University of Pennsylvania in 1950.

Neo-Evangelicalism and Founding Fuller 
Although Harrison served on the faculty of Dallas Theological Seminary from 1928–1939 and 1944–1947, he became an important figure in the Neo-Evangelical movement of the mid 20th Century. Harrison was an important figure involved in rejecting J. Gresham Machen's call to leave the Presbyterian Church, and had an on/off relationship with the Dallas Theological Seminary and its President Lewis Chafer, due to Chafer's fundamentalist view of dispensationalism.

Harrison was pastor at the Third Presbyterian Church in Chester, Pennsylvania from 1940 to 1944.

In 1947, Harrison accepted Charles Fuller's invitation to become a charter faculty member of Fuller Theological Seminary, and remained there until his retirement in 1980. Harrison was also one of the founding signers of the National Association of Evangelicals.

References 

1902 births
1999 deaths
Princeton Theological Seminary alumni
American theologians
American Presbyterian ministers
20th-century American clergy